Fuel Research Aluminium Stearate (FRAS), is mixture of chemical substances, used as an incendiary agent by the United Kingdom during the Second World War.

It is hygroscopic fuel developed by the Fuel Research Station of the Department of Scientific and Industrial Research.

In the conflict in Europe, it was the fuel of the M1A1 flamethrower. Delivered ready to use. It was used as fuel for individual flamethrowers, for the Churchill Crocodile flamethrower tank (standard fuel), and was studied as a precursor in the 5B incendiary paste used in the flame-fougasse.

It was adopted by the Canadian Army  in 1942 and by the British War Office 1943. The Australian army leaned towards the adoption of the FRAS, however, due to the instability of the FRAS in the tropical climate, it was discarded.

History 
After the start of the Second World War, concerned with the development, research and technical mastery of incendiary mixtures, the Mixture Committee was formed in the second half of the year 1940 by the Director of Fuel Research, Dr. Frank Sturdy Sinnatt. The development of material, such as a substitute for rubber, was started in January 1942, in several works, by several members of the committee.

In early investigative work, the standard component was rubber, being the constituent in several incendiary mixtures. Its anomalous viscosity being essential for flamethrower fuel. The use of this component deteriorated with the Japanese take over of Malaysia in February 1942.

The initial results of the development of the thickened fuel turned out to be unsatisfactory but an additive remedied the deficiencies of the gel. After this resolution, a special investigation into the manufacture of soaps was carried out, solving the problems of the thickener.

Work with FRAS gels was then carried out at the Fuel Research Station until fuel production was taken over by the Ministry of Supply. The Fuel Research Station continued to serve as an advisor on the industrial scale production and improvement of FRAS and its precursors, of which around 41 million litres were manufactured and used in the European theatre.

Military use 
The service fuel has undergone various degrees of requirements, both due to the seasons and the war zone. In general, production plants prepared two types of fuel for flamethrowers.

FRAS was mainly used in Europe The British fuel was widely used by American forces as fuel for the M1A1 flamethrower. Some units used it in preference to napalm. The napalm gel had a tendency to channel in fuel tanks, resulting in incomplete exhaustion of the fuel. Due to Britain's economic condition, "K" fuel was in short supply, particularly when the US Third Army  landed on the continent.

Transport and handling
The batches of fuel were conditioned in drums, then stored in open spaces and in a stacked manner. The transfer process, to flamethrowers or other devices, were problematic, particularly for mechanized flamethrower fuel.

The process of working with the drum for Crocodile proved to be especially laborious, requiring the construction of a high structure and a side opening in the drum to facilitate its handling. US Army flamethrower users were given a 5 US gallon "Jerrycan".

See also 

 Isooctal
 Hydroxy-aluminum 2-ethylhexanoate

Notes

References

Works cited

External links 

 
 
 
 
 
 
 

Incendiary weapons
Flamethrowers
British inventions
World War II weapons